The 76th Infantry Brigade Combat Team ("Night Hawks") is a modular infantry brigade of the United States Army National Guard of Indiana. It is headquartered in Lawrence Readiness Training Center, on the grounds of Fort Benjamin Harrison.

History
In the buildup to World War I, the United States Congress approved the formation of seventeen new National Guard divisions, numbered 26 through 42. The states of Indiana, Kentucky, and West Virginia were chosen to provide units for the 38th Infantry Division. Indiana's 151st and 152nd Infantry regiments formed the new 76th Infantry Brigade. One field artillery regiment from the 38th Division served in combat in France as part of the new 42nd (Rainbow) Division. The rest of the 38th Division arrived in France in October 1918 and Julius Penn was assigned to command the 76th Brigade. The division's organization and training were still in progress during the war's final offensive, so it was used to provide replacement soldiers for front line units.

The 38th Division was activated for federal service again in 1941, with the same organizational structure that had been used in World War I. However, in 1942, the Army reorganized its structure, and the 76th Brigade ceased to exist as an identifiable military organization.

On 1 March 1963, as part of the Army's Reorganization Objective Army Division (ROAD), the Headquarters and Headquarters Company of the 1st Brigade, 38th Infantry Division was born. Less than 20 months later, it was restored to its 1917 designation of 76th Infantry Brigade, known as the "Blue Devil" Brigade. Since the creation of the 76th Brigade at Indianapolis on 1 November 1965, the unit has moved to Columbus, to Camp Atterbury and to Bedford, with units located throughout southern Indiana.

Out of the ashes of the Blue Devil Brigade, the Nighthawk Brigade was formed. The 76th Infantry Brigade (Separate) was formed on 1 September 1994 at Indianapolis, Indiana this time with units located throughout the state of Indiana. The Nighthawk Brigade was selected to be one of the 15 enhanced brigades with a charter to achieve and maintain a higher state of readiness than previously expected of National Guard brigades. The unit relied heavily on the existing infantry regiments. The lineage of each combat regiment still in Indiana can be found within the brigade.

Under a plan approved by Army Chief of Staff General Eric K. Shinseki, in December 2000 the Army announced which active and reserve forces will see service in Bosnia and Kosovo through May 2005. Under the plan, units from the active Army and reserve forces supported the Stabilization Force mission, known as SFOR, in Bosnia or the Kosovo Force, known as KFOR, for six-month periods. SFOR 11 (April 2002 – October 2002) consists of the 116th Cavalry Brigade (enhanced separate brigade), Idaho Army National Guard; 76th Infantry Brigade (enhanced separate brigade), Indiana Army National Guard. Units from the 34th Infantry Division, Minnesota Army National Guard, also supported SFOR 11.

Late 2002 the 76th BDE was called on to provide a Separate Infantry Battalion to provide support for an escalating campaign in the Middle East. The 1st Battalion, 293rd Infantry Regiment was mobilized to camp Arifjan Kuwait on 2 January 2003. The "Nightfighters" set up security for the newly constructed support base. On D+5 the 1st Battalion, 293rd Infantry Regiment was called on to move north to support Operation Iraqi Freedom, with the attachment of Company A, 1st Battalion 152nd Infantry, to the vicinity of Tallil Air Base near the city of An Nasiriyah, Iraq.  1st Battalion, 293rd Infantry subsequently returned to Kuwait in the summer and redeployed to Indiana in October 2003. The 1st Battalion, 152nd Infantry "Predators" were mobilized at Camp Atterbury, Indiana on 2 January 2003 and deployed to Kuwait in mid-February 2003.  The 1st Battalion, 152nd Infantry employed companies in Baghdad (initially in support of 5th Special Forces Group), Forward Operating Base Kalsu (approximately 30 miles south of Baghdad in the "Sunni Triangle"), and Convoy Service Center Scania, both of which were along Main Supply Route (MSR) Tampa.  In January 2004, 1st Battalion 152nd Infantry was replaced by 2nd Battalion, 505th Parachute Infantry Regiment and redeployed to Indiana in February 2004. 

On 6 April 2004 elements of the 76th Infantry Brigade were ordered to mobilize for deployment to Afghanistan. Three hundred soldiers from the 113th Support Battalion, and an unidentified number of soldiers from the 1st Battalion, 151st Infantry Regiment, the 38th Military Police Company, and the 1438th Transportation Company began deploying in July 2004.

The unit suffered at least four casualties, on 26 March 2005, four soldiers, Captain Michael T. Fiscus, Master Sergeant Michael T. Heister, Specialist Brett M. Hershey, and Private First Class Norman K. Snyder were killed when a mine detonated near their vehicle as they were traveling near Kabul.

In October 2004, the 376th Engineer Company was mobilized for duty in Mosul, Iraq, in support of Operation Iraqi Freedom.

In December 2007, the Brigade was activated again to support Operation Iraqi Freedom. The Brigade trained for 1 month at Camp Atterbury, Indiana and then on 3 January 2008 moved to Fort Stewart, GA to conduct an additional 2 and 1/2 months training before deploying to Iraq.  Once in Iraq, the Brigade HQ assumed duties of the Garrison Command at Joint Base Balad. The 1st BN 293rd Infantry, also at Balad, was under the Operational Control of the 55th Sustainment Brigade and conducted convoy security missions throughout Central Iraq.  The 1st BN 151st Infantry conducted a similar mission out of Camp Spicher (Tikrit, Iraq). 1–163 FA was assigned Convoy Security duties operating out of Mosul. The 1–152 Cavalry was under the Operational Control of 17th Sustainment Brigade and provide Convoy Security from Q-West.  Other elements of the Brigade were assigned across the country. The Brigade returned to Indiana in December 2008 after a successful mission.

In November 2012, Headquarters Company returned from a nine-month deployment to Afghanistan, in support of Operation Enduring Freedom.

Order of battle
The brigade is currently composed of the following units:

 Brigade Headquarters and Headquarters Company (BHHC)
 1st Battalion, 151st Infantry Regiment
 2nd Battalion, 151st Infantry Regiment
 2nd Battalion, 152nd Infantry Regiment
 1st Battalion, 293rd Infantry Regiment
 1st Squadron, 152nd Cavalry Regiment
 1st Battalion, 163rd Field Artillery Regiment (1–163rd FAR)
 113th Brigade Support Battalion (113th BSB)
 776th Brigade Engineer Battalion (776th BEB)

Sources
Public Affairs Office, 76th Brigade Combat Team

References

External links
76th Infantry Brigade Combat Team
The Institute of Heraldry: 76th Infantry Brigade
GlobalSecurity.org: 76th Infantry Brigade

Infantry 999 076
Infantry 999 076
Infantry 999 076
Military units and formations in Indiana
Military units and formations established in 1963